Church of St. John in the Wilderness is a historic Episcopal church in Copake Falls, Columbia County, New York.  The church, its furnishing, and the parsonage were designed by noted ecclesiastical architect Richard Upjohn (1802–1878).  It was built in 1851 and is a one-story wood-frame building clad with board and batten siding in the Gothic Revival style.  It features an open frame bell cote topped by a steep gable roof.  Also on the property are a contributing parsonage (1853) and two cemeteries.

Worship is progressive Christian, following the Book of Common Prayer and The Hymnal 1982. Sunday School is provided for the children and a choir sings at the principal service. Under the leadership of the Rev. John Thompson, The Church of St. John in the Wilderness has become a cultural center for Copake Falls, hosting stage plays, chamber music (Winds in the Wilderness), and Jazz Vespers. Each year, the church sponsors the Country Fair and Auction in July, Harvest Fest in October, and participates in Copake Falls Day in August.

It was listed on the National Register of Historic Places in 1995.  It is located within the Copake Iron Works Historic District, established in 2007.

References

External links
 Church of St. John in the Wilderness, the Episcopal Church in Copake Falls
 

Episcopal church buildings in New York (state)
Churches on the National Register of Historic Places in New York (state)
Carpenter Gothic church buildings in New York (state)
Churches completed in 1851
19th-century Episcopal church buildings
Churches in Columbia County, New York
Cemeteries in Columbia County, New York
1851 establishments in New York (state)
National Register of Historic Places in Columbia County, New York
Individually listed contributing properties to historic districts on the National Register in New York (state)